Ulluaya (Dargwa: Хала-гIяя) is a rural locality (a selo) in Levashinsky District, Republic of Dagestan, Russia. The population was 5,962 as of 2010. There are 46 streets.

Geography 
Ulluaya is located 8 km southeast of Levashi (the district's administrative centre) by road, on the Khalagork River. Tagirkent and Suleybakent are the nearest rural localities.

Nationalities 
Dargins live there.

References 

Rural localities in Levashinsky District